"Hold What You've Got" is a 1964 single by Joe Tex.  The single was his second chart release and first to reach the Billboard Hot 100.  "Hold What You've Got" went to number one on the Cash Box R&B chart,  and reached number five in 1965, on the pop chart.

Background
The song is noted for the two spoken recitations, between the refrains of the song, telling, first the men, and then the women to keep on supporting their loved ones and not take them for granted.

References

1964 singles
Joe Tex songs
1964 songs
Songs written by Joe Tex